Berryessa/North San José station (also known as Berryessa station and Berryessa Transit Center) is an intermodal transit center located in the Berryessa district of San Jose, California. The station is served by Bay Area Rapid Transit (BART) and Santa Clara Valley Transportation Authority (VTA) buses. The transit center opened for bus service on December 28, 2019, and subsequently for BART service on June 13, 2020.

The station was built and is owned by VTA, while BART operates train service with funding from VTA. The bus bays and parking garages are operated by VTA. It is the first BART station ever built in San Jose, and service will terminate here until the completion of the downtown San Jose subway (the last phase of the Silicon Valley BART extension).

Station layout 

Berryessa/North San José station has a  elevated island platform, with a fare lobby under the center of the platform. An adjacent seven-story garage and surface lot have a combined 1,527 parking spaces, while a bike station is located under the north end of the platform. The site is adjacent to the San Jose Flea Market.

The Berryessa Transit Center, a two-lane bus transfer facility, is located adjacent to the north end of the station. Rapid 500 and Rapid 523 provide limited-stop connections to Downtown San Jose; Rapid 500 also serves San Jose Diridon station.

The station features a  cast bronze sculpture by Larry Kirkland, titled LIFE!, outside the main BART entrance. The sculpture depicts a wheel made of various items from daily life being rolled by a human figurine.

History 

This station is the southern of the two stations built as part of an extension from Warm Springs/South Fremont. The extension, known as Phase I of the Silicon Valley BART extension, broke ground in 2012 with completion initially expected in 2016 but delayed several times. VTA received a $900 million grant for federal funding for the $2.3-billion Silicon Valley Extension in 2012. Additional funding was provided by Measure B, a half-cent sales tax passed by Santa Clara County voters in 2016; the Road Repair and Accountability Act, passed by the California Legislature in 2017; and $125 million from the Federal Transit Administration in 2019 under a fast-track funding program.

In 2017, at the request of the San Jose City Council, the station was renamed from Berryessa to "Berryessa/North San José" to "alert riders – commuters and tourists alike – that they have arrived in the Capital of the Silicon Valley".

On June 11, 2020, a group of Silicon Valley politicians proposed to have the station officially renamed as the "Ron Gonzales Berryessa Station" after Ron Gonzales, former mayor of San Jose, who began advocating for a Silicon Valley BART extension in 1989 while serving as a Santa Clara County Supervisor. BART station naming guidelines would likely discourage such a renaming.

An official ribbon cutting for the BART station was held on June 12, 2020. Berryessa/North San José and Milpitas stations opened for revenue service on June 13, 2020.

References

External links 

 Berryessa/North San José Station BART
 Get familiar with VTA's Berryessa Transit Center
 VTA project site
 

Railway stations in the United States opened in 2020
Stations on the Orange Line (BART)
Stations on the Green Line (BART)
Bay Area Rapid Transit stations in Santa Clara County, California
Santa Clara Valley Transportation Authority bus stations
2020 establishments in California
Railway stations in San Jose, California